"Asterisks" is an international children's festival in the Republic of North Macedonia. It takes place in October every year in the town of Prilep. It is organized by Estrada Multimedia Center.

The festival strives to produce children's hits and to make the participant children new little stars.

The main intention of the 
festival is to create strong friendship bonds between the children from different ethnic and religious backgrounds and to practice the principles of collective living, interpersonal tolerance and understanding, as well as overcoming the cultural differences between the children from all over the world.

The festival is intended to be a big show for children from all over the world where they have the opportunity to show their capabilities, sing their children's songs and have fun. The festival days are a real holiday for the children because everything on this festival is prearranged especially for them.

External links
"Asterisks" official website
Denis Dimoski official website

Children's music festivals
Children's festivals in North Macedonia
Prilep